Tafraoui is a municipality in Oran Province, Algeria close to the city of Oran. There is an airport with the same name. Capturing Tafaraoui Airport was a part of Operation Torch in the World War II.

References

Communes of Oran Province
Military history of Algeria during World War II
World War II sites in Algeria
Cities in Algeria
Algeria